Kersaint may refer to:

 The family Coëtnempren de Kersaint, among whom:
 Guy François Coëtnempren de Kersaint (1703—1759), French Navy officer and admiral
 Joseph Coëtnempren de Kersaint (1746—1797), French Navy officer, son of Guy François de Kersaint
 Armand de Kersaint (1742–1793), French Navy officer and politician, son of Guy François de Kersaint
 Guy Pierre Kersaint (1747–1822), French Navy officer, son of Guy François de Kersaint
 Kersaint-Plabennec, a commune in the Finistère department of Brittany in northwestern France
 , several French warships